Amyand Park Chapel  is a Reformed Baptist church on Amyand Park Road in St Margarets, near Twickenham, in the London Borough of Richmond upon Thames. It is a Bible-preaching church, committed to the gospel, and has its heritage in reformation and Baptist teachings.

The church was founded on 18 October 1889, first meeting in an economical "iron church" structure. The current building was opened in 1952, with the Rev.Martyn Lloyd-Jones of Westminster Chapel preaching at its dedication service.

The church's ministry continues today in a number of ways, with weekly worship services and prayer meetings, Sunday school and children's clubs, and special events. Its current pastor is Gerard Hemmings.

References

External links
 Official website

1889 establishments in England
Baptist churches in the London Borough of Richmond upon Thames
Churches completed in 1952
Churches in St Margarets, London
Reformed Baptists
Religious organizations established in 1889
Twickenham